The Muhammad Nawaz Shareef University of Agriculture (MNSUAM) is a public university located in Multan, Punjab, Pakistan. It was established in 2012 on the initiative of Chief Minister Punjab Mian Muhammad Shahbaz Sharif. The university is named after Nawaz Sharif. The Act of Muhammad Nawaz Shareef University of Agriculture was approved in 2013.

History
The university was founded in 2012. It has a total area of 680 acres located at two places. A piece of land comprising 180 acres is allocated at mouza rangeel pur, old shujabad road, Multan, where upon the main campus of the university is located and another piece comprising 500 acres is allotted at Jalalpur pirwala for agriculture farm.

External links

External links
 MNSUAM Official Website
 PFNO Official Website

Public universities and colleges in Punjab, Pakistan
2012 establishments in Pakistan
Educational institutions established in 2012
Universities and colleges in Multan
Agricultural universities and colleges in Pakistan